Narreh Sang-e Bala (also Romanized as Narreh Sang-e Bālā and Narah Sang-e Bālā; also known as Nareh Sang Olya, Narreh Sang-i-Buzurg, and Narreh Sanq-e Bozorg) is a village in Momenabad Rural District, in the Central District of Sarbisheh County, South Khorasan Province, Iran. At the 2006 census, its population was 33, in 11 families.

References 

Populated places in Sarbisheh County